

Background 
Tres Niños School, Inc. is a private co-educational school offering Preparatory, Primary and Secondary education. It is located at San Carlos, Binangonan, Rizal, Philippines. The school has been recognized by the Bureau of Secondary Education.

Tres Niños School, Inc. Has one campus. Its K to 12 and administration building is located on Rita Street, San Carlos, Bingangonan, Rizal and its High school division has been recently moved to the same building as its preparatory and elementary building since July 16, 2016 and currently has construction ongoing.

References

External links
 
 Photographs

High schools in Rizal
Educational institutions established in 1994
1994 establishments in the Philippines
Binangonan, Rizal